G. K. Yarboi was a Ghanaian soldier, politician, and member of the National Liberation Council. He was the Chairman of the Ashanti Region Committee of Administration  from 1967 to 1969.

Biography 
Yarboi was born in the 1936 in the Central Region. He joined the army as a private, and became a quartermaster in 1966. In May 1967, he was appointed Chairman of the Ashanti Regional Administration Committee (Regional Minister). He worked in this capacity from May 1967 to 1969 when the country was ushered into civilian rule. He was succeeded by Henry Reginald Annan.

Yarboi's hobbies included playing football.

References 

1936 births
Ghanaian soldiers
Ghanaian military personnel
20th-century births
Year of death missing